Guo Youzhi ( third century), courtesy name Yanchang, was an official of the state of Shu Han in the Three Kingdoms period (220–280) of China. Zhuge Liang, the Imperial Chancellor of Shu, described Guo Youzhi in the Chu Shi Biao as exceedingly loyal and faithful, and named him along with Dong Yun and Fei Yi as the more competent officials in Shu while advising the Shu emperor Liu Shan to make good use of their talents.

See also
 Lists of people of the Three Kingdoms

References

 Chen, Shou (3rd century). Records of the Three Kingdoms (Sanguozhi).
 Pei, Songzhi (5th century). Annotations to Records of the Three Kingdoms (Sanguozhi zhu).

Year of birth unknown
Year of death unknown
Shu Han politicians
Politicians from Nanyang, Henan